Rwimi Hydroelectric Power Station, also Rwimi Power Station, is an operational  hydroelectric power station in the Western Region of Uganda.

Location
The power station is located on the Rwimi River, along the border between Kasese District and Bunyangabu District.

The coordinates of Rwimi Hydroelectric Power Station are:0°23'10.0"N, 30°11'07.0"E (Latitude:0.386111; Longitude:30.185278).

Overview
Eco Power (Private) Limited, the single largest power company in Sri Lanka, through its Ugandan subsidiary, Eco Power Uganda Limited was awarded the development rights to the project.

Construction costs
The construction costs were budgeted at US$21.1 million (initially US$20.9 million). Of that, the Belgian Investment Company for Developing Countries (BIO), is lending US$13 million, Norfund is lending US$4.2 million (NOK:33.4 million), and GETFit Uganda is providing US$3.9 million through KfW.

Construction timeline
In October 2014, the Electricity Regulatory Authority (ERA), licensed nine new renewable energy projects. One of those nine, is Rwimi Power Station. Construction was expected to begin in December 2014 and last approximately 24 months. Construction began in July 2015, with a new date of starting commercial operations in the second half of 2017.

See also

Africa Dams
Uganda Power Stations

References

External links
 Website of Uganda Electricity Regulatory Authority

Hydroelectric power stations in Uganda
Bunyangabu District
Kasese District
Western Region, Uganda
Dams completed in 2017
2017 establishments in Uganda
Energy infrastructure completed in 2017